Rohan Bopanna and Pablo Cuevas were the defending champions, but Bopanna chose to compete in Basel and Cuevas chose to compete in Lima instead.

Joe Salisbury and Neal Skupski won the title, defeating Mike Bryan and Édouard Roger-Vasselin in the final, 7–6(7–5), 6–3. Bryan secured the year-end ATP no. 1 doubles ranking by reaching the final.

Seeds

Draw

Draw

Qualifying

Seeds

Qualifiers
  Denys Molchanov /  Igor Zelenay

Lucky losers

Qualifying draw

External links
 Main draw
 Qualifying draw

Erste Bank Open - Doubles
Vienna Open